Besir Demiri (born 1 August 1994) is an Albanian professional footballer who plays as a defensive midfielder or left-back for Dinamo Tirana.

Club career
Demiri started playing football in the youth club of Shkupi Čair, and in 2013 he also joined their first team to perform in the Macedonian Second Football League. After two years playing for Shkupi, in January 2015 he transferred to Shkendija Tetovo to play in Macedonia's top division. In December 2016 he transferred to Vardar Skopje. In February 2018 he moved to Ukrainian Premier League club FC Mariupol.

International career
Demiri made his debut for the Macedonia U21 national team in 2014 and he has been a regular player in the following 2 years after that. On 27 June 2016, after his great performance and debut goal in the Euro U21 qualifying match against Ukraine U21, Demiri received an additional call up for the Macedonia A team. Only 2 days later, he already made his debut for the National Team in the 3:1 win against Azerbaijan where he was substituted in for Bojan Najdenov in the 83rd minute. On 2 September 2018, he was called-up to Albania national football team for 2018–19 UEFA Nations League matches.

References

External links
 
 

1994 births
Living people
Footballers from Skopje
Albanian footballers from North Macedonia
Association football midfielders
Macedonian footballers
North Macedonia international footballers
North Macedonia under-21 international footballers
North Macedonia youth international footballers
Albanian footballers
FK Shkupi players
KF Shkëndija players
FK Vardar players
FC Mariupol players
MŠK Žilina players
Macedonian First Football League players
Macedonian Second Football League players
Ukrainian Premier League players
Slovak Super Liga players
Macedonian expatriate footballers
Albanian expatriate footballers
Expatriate footballers in Ukraine
Macedonian expatriate sportspeople in Ukraine
Albanian expatriate sportspeople in Ukraine
Expatriate footballers in Slovakia
Macedonian expatriate sportspeople in Slovakia
Albanian expatriate sportspeople in Slovakia